Manor Road railway station serves the town of Hoylake and village of Meols in Merseyside, England. It lies on the West Kirby branch of the Wirral Line, part of the Merseyrail network.

History
Proposed by 1936, the station was opened on 15 May 1940 by the London Midland and Scottish Railway, following their 1938 electrification of the former Wirral Railway's route from Birkenhead to West Kirby and the start of through trains to Liverpool.

Facilities
The station is staffed during all opening hours, and has platform CCTV. Each of the two platforms has a seated waiting shelter. There is a payphone, booking office and live departure and arrival screens, for passenger information. The station does not have a car park, but does have a secure cycle storage for 10 cycles. There is step-free access available only for the Liverpool-bound platform, for wheelchairs and prams.

Services
Current services are every 15 minutes (Monday to Saturday daytime) to West Kirby and Liverpool.  At other times, trains operate every 30 minutes. These services are all provided by Merseyrail's fleet of Class 507 and Class 508 EMUs.

Gallery

References

Sources

Further reading

External links 

Railway stations in the Metropolitan Borough of Wirral
DfT Category E stations
Former London, Midland and Scottish Railway stations
Railway stations in Great Britain opened in 1940
Railway stations served by Merseyrail